Veronika Žilková (born 16 October 1961 in Prague) is a Czech actress. 

She played the part of Božena Horáková in the 2000 Czech film, Little Otik also known as Otesánek. In 1997 she received the Czech Lion Award as the best supporting actress for her role in Zapomenuté světlo (Forgotten Light).

Theatre

The Drama Club, Prague 
The Toth Family .... Ágika (István Örkény)
A Midsummer Night's Sex Comedy (1993) .... Ariel (Woody Allen)
Le Mariage de Figaro (play) (1994) .... Countess (Pierre-Augustin Caron de Beaumarchais)
Killer Joe (1996) .... Sharla Smith, waitress in the bar "Cosmic Love" (Tracy Letts)
Třetí zvonění .... Růžena (Václav Štech)
Letní byt (1999) .... Rosina (Carlo Goldoni)
Portgualie (2001) .... woman (Zoltán Egressy)

References

External links 
ČSFD

1961 births
Living people
Czech film actresses
Czech television actresses
Czech comedians
20th-century Czech actresses
21st-century Czech actresses
Actresses from Prague
Czech Lion Awards winners